Quavas Kirk (born April 13, 1988 in Aurora, Illinois) is an American soccer player who currently plays for Schwaben AC in the Metropolitan Soccer League, a USASA 6th-level league.

Career

Youth
Kirk did not play college soccer; he joined the U.S. U-17 Residency Program at the IMG Soccer Academy in Bradenton, Florida, before signing a Generation adidas contract in 2005.

Professional
Kirk was drafted in the 3rd round (34th overall) of the 2005 MLS SuperDraft by Los Angeles Galaxy. He made his MLS debut in 2006, and scored his first professional goal on August 1, 2006 in the Lamar Hunt U.S. Open Cup in a 2-0 fourth-round win over Dallas Roma.

Until the arrival of David Beckham, Kirk wore the number 23 shirt for the Galaxy. However, despite publicly announcing his desire to retain the jersey, he was handed the number 15 to accommodate Beckham, who prefers to wear number 7 or 23. (Beckham had chosen the number 23 because 7 was already taken when he was transferred to Real Madrid by Raul, and also because he admires Michael Jordan).

On February 15, 2008, Kirk was traded to D.C. United in exchange for the rights to Greg Vanney He scored his first career league goal on August 23, 2008 in a 3-0 DC win over the Colorado Rapids.

In January 2009, Kirk was waived by D.C. United. After a brief trial with Seattle Sounders FC, Kirk signed with Minnesota Thunder on 17 February 2009. He made 15 league appearances for the Thunder in 2009, before being released from his contract as a result of Thunder's financial problems following the conclusion of the 2009 USL First Division season. He was signed by the Portland Timbers on December 7, 2009.

Kirk trialled with the Portland Timbers, looking to secure a place on their roster prior to their first season in Major League Soccer in 2011, but suffered a hamstring injury in a pre-season game against Ventura County Fusion, and was not offered a contract by the team. Kirk subsequently signed with Rochester Rhinos of the USL Pro league on March 25, 2011. He re-signed with Rochester in January 2012.

After a couple seasons with Schwaben FC out of Buffalo Grove, Illinois, Kirk  played for amateur side Stare Byki FC out of Oak Brook, Illinois.

International
Kirk had been a standout in the United States' under-17 national team, scoring 22 goals in 53 games. He played in the 2005 U-17 World Championship, and was expected to play a key role for the U-20 national team in the 2007 FIFA U-20 World Cup but picked up a pre-tournament injury and was excluded from the roster.

Coaching
Kirk is the Director of Private Training at Soccer Speed.

References

External links
Portland Timbers bio
Minnesota Thunder bio 
MLS player profile

1988 births
Living people
American soccer players
LA Galaxy players
D.C. United players
Minnesota Thunder players
Portland Timbers (2001–2010) players
Rochester New York FC players
Sportspeople from Aurora, Illinois
Major League Soccer players
USL First Division players
USSF Division 2 Professional League players
USL Championship players
United States men's youth international soccer players
LA Galaxy draft picks
Soccer players from Illinois
Association football fullbacks